Andabad-e Olya (also Romanized as Andābād-e ‘Olyā; also known as And Ābād, Andābād-e Bālā, Andābād Oliab, and Andābād ‘Ulīāb) is a village in Qanibeyglu Rural District, Zanjanrud District, Zanjan County, Zanjan Province, Iran. At the 2006 census, its population was 531, in 146 families.

References 

Populated places in Zanjan County